Charles David Cook (February 26, 1935 – May 23, 2001) was an American politician. He served in the New York State legislature for over 25 years. He was elected Senator in 1978.

Biography
Born in Deposit, New York, Cook graduated from Hancock Central School in 1952, and received his bachelor's degree in political science from Hartwick College in 1956.

He became editor of the Bainbridge News in 1957, and entered the U.S. Army in 1958. Upon honorable discharge in 1960, he became editor of the Deposit Courier. In 1965, he entered public service when he was elected Delaware County treasurer and moved to Delhi, New York in December of that year. He held that position until his appointment as Delaware County commissioner of social services in 1971.

He was a member of the New York State Assembly from 1973 to 1978, sitting in the 180th, 181st and 182nd New York State Legislatures. He was a member of the New York State Senate from 1979 to 1998, sitting in the 183rd, 184th, 185th, 186th, 187th, 188th, 189th, 190th, 191st and 192nd New York State Legislatures. Cook had extensive committee involvement during his tenure in the state legislature, chairing committees on education, local government, transportation, and agriculture. He was the first chairman of the Legislative Commission on Rural Resources, which became known nationally for its programs to address the needs of rural residents. As chairman, he authored the legislation which established the New York State Office of Rural Health, which was later named after him, and founded the program of state grants to assist rural health care providers in extending and maintaining services in rural communities. He was credited in helping to maintain a $10,000,000 annual budgetary appropriation to support rural hospitals in diversifying and expanding outpatient services, a program that is still in operation. He also served as a member of the Legislative Commission on Critical Transportation Choices, and the Council on Health Care Financing.

He was appointed by President George H. W. Bush and his Secretary of Health and Human Services Louis Sullivan to the National Advisory Committee on Rural Health, and was summoned to the White House to meet with the president in 1992 as a representative of New York State in discussions concerning the proposed Balanced Budget Amendment.

As chairman of the senate Education Committee, he was the original author of what ultimately became the STAR program for relief of school property taxes for New York residents.

In 1993, he participated in the Oxford University Education Round Table as an internationally recognized expert on education policy, alongside such leaders as the education ministers of Norway, Croatia, Belarus, Philippines, Russia, South Africa, Portugal, Sweden, Jamaica, Ethiopia, Hungary, and Estonia.

Cook helped broker a crucial agreement between New York City and upstate communities in resolution of the heated and protracted controversy regarding watershed regulations in the Catskill mountain region, and he authored original early intervention legislation that provided for early identification, diagnosis, and treatment of developmental disabilities in children.

Cook served in numerous volunteer and civic roles even during his years as a legislator. He was a trustee at Hartwick College, and a member of the Government Law Center Advisory Board at Albany Law School of Union College. He received an honorary doctor of laws degree from Hartwick in 1989.

Cook, who had developed heart disease, retired from the Senate in 1998 on the advice of his physicians. During his time in the legislature, Cook represented all or parts of 11 different counties, or one-sixth of all the counties in New York State. In retirement, Cook became a trustee of O'Connor Hospital, and was chairman of its annual fundraising efforts. He was also a member of Friends of Bassett Hospital, and served as a member of the New York State Rural Health Council and the New York State Partnership Trust. He also served as a member of the board of directors of a campus ministry organization in Oneonta, and was an honorary director of Delaware-Otsego Planned Parenthood. He was a recipient of a statewide pro-choice award. Cook also served as an adjunct professor in retirement, teaching history and government courses at Hartwick College, SUNY New Paltz, and SUNY Delhi.

Personal life
Cook was married to the former Dorothy Behrens, who was co-founder of and long-time teacher at the Delhi Christian Playschool. Together, they had five children, Edward (deceased), David (deceased), Linda, John, and Jeffrey, and seven grandchildren. The Cooks were active members of the United Ministry of Delhi, where Charles Cook often served as lay preacher and participated in committee work.

Upon Cook's death on May 23, 2001 at the age of 66, flags at the New York State Capitol were ordered to half-mast, and a flag flew in his honor over the U.S. Capitol. Among the honors made in his memory, the New York State Office of Rural Health, the Delaware County Office Building, the Children's Center at SUNY New Paltz, a state nursing education partnership program, and a fire-fighting training center are named after him.

References

External links
The Sen. Charles D. Cook Memorial

1935 births
2001 deaths
Hartwick College alumni
Republican Party members of the New York State Assembly
Republican Party New York (state) state senators
People from Delaware County, New York
People from Delhi, New York
20th-century American politicians